Savonians (Savonian: Savolaaset, Savolaeset) are a subgroup (heimo) of the Finnish people who live in the areas of the historical province of Savonia.

History

Savonians are descendants of Tavastian and Karelian peasants who, during the Middle Ages, had settled in the areas that would later become known as Savonia in order to find new lands suitable for slash-and-burn agriculture. During 16th and 17th centuries, many Savonians emigrated to Eastern Norway and Central Sweden were they became known as the Forest Finns. In the 17th century, there was also a migration to Swedish Ingria (now part of Russia), where they became known as Savakot and collectively known as the Ingrian Finns together with the Äyrämöiset (Finnish Karelians).

Description and stereotypes
The stereotypical Savonian is talkative, easy-going, jolly and humorous, occasionally even to an offensive degree. Traditionally, the Savonians have often been considered to be "sneaky" and "mendacious." However, recent research has shown that this infamy is largely due to misunderstandings caused by the traditional Savonian social indirectness.

Savonians and Karelians were the first people in Finland to use surnames, beginning during the Middle Ages. These surnames are known for containing the "nen" diminutive.

Famous Savonians

 Juhani Aho
 Hannu Aravirta
 Juhan af Grann
 Harri Hakkarainen
 Pekka Halonen
 Teemu Hartikainen
 Jukka Hentunen
 Marko Hietala
 Kari Hietalahti
 Pekka Janhunen
 Olli Jokinen
 Jussi Jääskeläinen
 Juha Kankkunen
 Kasperi Kapanen
 Sami Kapanen
 Klaus Karppinen
 Urho Kekkonen
 Kalle Kerman
 Harri Kirvesniemi
 Hannes Kolehmainen
 Mikko Kolehmainen
 Sakari Kuosmanen
 Kaapo Kähkönen
 Esapekka Lappi
 Kari Laukkanen
 Juice Leskinen
 Otto Leskinen
 Erkki Liikanen
 Paavo Lipponen
 Eetu Luostarinen
 Paavo Lötjönen
 Otto Manninen
 Sanna Marin
 Jarmo Myllys
 Ari-Pekka Nikkola
 Spede Pasanen
 Joonas Rask
 Tuukka Rask
 Timo Rautiainen
 Olli Rehn
 Rasmus Rissanen
 Antti Ruuskanen
 Eero Saarinen
 Eliel Saarinen
 Arja Saijonmaa
 Heikki Silvennoinen
 Kari Tapio
 Ilpo Tiihonen
 Jussi Timonen
 Kimmo Timonen
 Erkki Toivanen
 Marko Tuomainen
 Allu Tuppurainen
 Kari Ukkonen
 Jenni Vartiainen
 Iiro Viinanen
 Jukka Voutilainen
 Ismo Leikola

References

Ethnic groups in Finland
Savonia (historical province)